The 2015–16 season was PEC Zwolle's 105th season of play, it marked its 16th season in the Eredivisie and its 4th consecutive season in the top flight of Dutch football. They ended the season eight in the league. PEC Zwolle entered the KNVB Cup in the second round. They started their campaign by losing to Feyenoord.

Competitions

Friendlies

Eredivisie

League table

Results summary

League matches

Play-offs

KNVB Cup

Statistics

Squad details and appearances

Discipline
The list is sorted by surname when total cards are equal.

Top scorers
The list is sorted by Eredivisie goals when total goals are equal.

References

PEC Zwolle seasons
PEC Zwolle